"Surro-Gate" is the seventh episode of the fourth season of American Dad!. It originally aired on December 2, 2007. This episode mainly focuses on Stan, who hears the news that his gay neighbors Greg and Terry are planning on starting a family through IVF. Stan at first takes this as a joke, and tries to convince them to remain childless. When Greg and Terry have trouble finding a donor, Francine offers to be the surrogate mother for the couple's baby. Stan is enraged when he finds out that his wife is the surrogate for Greg and Terry's baby, and he later vows to take the infant to Nebraska to put her up for adoption. Meanwhile, Roger and Steve play a trick on Klaus, only for him to seek revenge on the two.

This episode was written by Erik Durbin and directed by Tim Parsons. It featured guest appearances from Jane Lynch, Leisha Hailey, and Mary Jo Catlett, as well as several recurring guest voice actors and actresses for the series.

Plot
Greg and Terry, the gay couple who live next-door, inform them they are planning to have a baby through in vitro fertilization. Francine is happy for them, but Stan having recently come to some level of acceptance of their homosexuality is against the idea of bringing children into a non-traditional family, believing it will make them dysfunctional (among other things, such as boys will play with dolls, girls will play with trucks and a nonsensical theory that it could lead to horses eating each other). The pair soon come into a problem, however, as they cannot find a surrogate mother they can agree on (Greg does not approve of anybody that Terry suggests). Francine volunteers to help them, and secretly becomes pregnant with their child without telling Stan out of fear of his reaction (filled with the thought of Stan attacking her with a broken bottle, changing to a chainsaw, changing it again to a live jaguar, finally changing it to a jaguar armed with a chainsaw). She does not tell Stan, even though she promised the unborn child she would eventually. Stan soon thinks that Greg and Terry have returned to their normal lives and Francine has become fat.

Stan eventually finds out (six months into the pregnancy), and while he is at first furious, Hayley, taking advantage of his pro-life values, reminds him that the baby is there and all he can do is do what is best for the baby instead of thinking of himself. Stan realizes that she is right, and soon becomes enthusiastic about preparing for the baby's birth. With Greg and Terry, they take parenting classes, the former being more adept. Soon Francine goes into labor, and she, Stan, Greg and Terry rush to the hospital, where she delivers a baby girl. Stan, however, soon kidnaps the baby, and goes on a cross-country drive to Nebraska, where gay couples do not have parental rights, so that the baby (whom he names "Liberty Belle") can have a normal family (i.e., at an orphanage).

Greg and Terry call on the "Rainbow Truckers" union for aid, and Stan and Liberty soon find themselves fleeing from gay-rights activists trying to stop them from reaching the state border, only finding support in the local bystanders he comes across. They are rescued by a woman on a quad bike named Lily (played by Leisha Hailey), who takes them to her home. Stan is impressed by Lily's two polite, well-behaved children (Jason and Mary), until he meets Lily's wife (played by Jane Lynch) Al—short for "Allison." The pair explain they are a lesbian couple who decided to bring him to their home to show him that a gay family can be stable and hopefully convince him to return baby Liberty to her parents. Stan, however, simply abducts their two children and steals their truck. As Stan drives all three children to the state border, the newest abductees argue with Stan that their family is great. The two then start fighting with each other, and Stan instinctively yells at them by calling them "Steve" and "Hayley" and then he realizes that the two do not seem any more dysfunctional than his own children and don't need straight parents (and that the horses are not eating each other), and so he returns the children to their respective families, an inch from the state border. Stan tried to apologize, but Greg and Terry punched him and put a restraining order on him as punishment for kidnapping their new baby, while allowing Francine and the others to play with the baby in the park, though they let Stan come (on the condition that he stay far enough away, of course); his methods of cooing her from afar proving obviously ineffective.

Meanwhile, Steve and Roger play a joke on Klaus by throwing him in his bowl down a water slide, and Klaus swears horrible, excruciatingly painful revenge on them. As a result, they grow paranoid and live in the attic for the nine months in which the episode takes place, starving, wearing diapers and not letting any can of food out of their sight for a second. The two eventually go insane and try to kill each other until they realize that the only way to regain their sanity is to confront Klaus and resign themselves to his wrath. Klaus, however, says he had forgotten about his threat, though now that they have reminded him, his vengeance is renewed. The two then put a stack of books on top of his bowl, trapping him, and wonder why they did not think of that before.

Production
This episode was written by Erik Durbin and directed by Tim Parsons, in his first episode of the series.

In addition to the regular cast, actresses Jane Lynch, Leisha Hailey, and Mary Jo Catlett guest starred in the episode. Recurring voice actors and writers Mike Barker, Erik Durbin, and Mike Henry made minor appearances.

Reception
"Surro-Gate" was broadcast on December 2, 2007 as part of the animated television line-up on Fox. It was preceded by reruns of The Simpsons, King of the Hill, and its sister show Family Guy. It was viewed by 6.48 million homes during its initial airing, according to the Nielson ratings, despite airing simultaneously with Cold Case on CBS and The Oprah Winfrey Show on ABC. It received a 3.2 rating in the 18-43 demographic.

"Surro-Gate" was met with mixed response from television critics. Genevieve Koski of The A.V. Club gave it a mixed review, calling it "predictable". She went on to write, "American Dad was obviously conceived as a more satire-oriented version of its big brother, Family Guy. Where Family Guy specializes in pop-culture gags and non sequitur after non sequitur after oh-my-god-another-freakin' non sequitur, American Dad likes to pick a single (often politically volatile) target and bludgeon it to death, sometimes with humorous results. However—and this may just be jaded ol' me grinding an axe here—I prefer the show much more when it avoids the standard hot-button issues (religion, gay marriage) and wanders into more absurd territory (Stan's stint as a meter maid, the Vacation Goo)". She went on to criticize the subplot: "I would have much preferred to see an all-out war between the two factions, rather than Roger and Steve wearing diapers and slowly growing even more pathetic". She gave the episode a C−, the lowest grade of the night.

References
Notes

External links

American Dad! (season 4) episodes
2007 American television episodes
American LGBT-related television episodes
LGBT parenting
LGBT-related animated television episodes